The 1879 City of Auckland West by-election was a by-election held  on 4 March 1879 in the  electorate during the 6th New Zealand Parliament. It was then a two-member electorate.

The by-election was caused by the resignation of the incumbent, Patrick Dignan, who had previously represented the electorate. He was a Catholic layman, and a supporter of denominational education.

David Goldie was elected. He supported secular education, and his victory was headlined "Another election victory for Secularists". Similarly the winner of the 1879 City of Nelson by-election was described as a "Secularist".

Result
The following table gives the election result:

References

Auckland West 1879
1879 elections in New Zealand
March 1879 events
Politics of the Auckland Region